The bee genus Anthophora is one of the largest in the family Apidae, with over 450 species worldwide in 14 different subgenera. They are most abundant and diverse in the Holarctic and African biogeographic regions. All species are solitary, though many nest in large aggregations. Nearly all species make nests in the soil, either in banks or in flat ground; the larvae develop in cells with waterproof linings and do not spin cocoons. Males commonly have pale white or yellow facial markings, and/or peculiarly modified leg armature and hairs. Anthophora individuals can be distinguished from the very similar genus Amegilla by the possession of an arolium between the tarsal claws.

Species include:
Anthophora bimaculata
Anthophora curta
Anthophora dispar
Anthophora edwardsii
Anthophora fedorica
Anthophora flexipes
Anthophora urbana
Anthophora furcata
Anthophora plumipes
Anthophora pueblo
Anthophora retusa

See also
 List of Anthophora species

References
C. D. Michener (2000) The Bees of the World, Johns Hopkins University Press.

External links
 Discover Life, Anthophora  Identification Guide
 Discover Life, List of Species
Discover Life, Worldwide Species Map
Anthophora abrupta Say on the UF / IFAS Featured Creatures Web site

Apinae
Bee genera
Taxa named by Pierre André Latreille